Arthur Edgar (22 May 1924 – 21 April 1992) was a New Zealand cricketer. He played in three first-class matches for Wellington in 1955/56.

See also
 List of Wellington representative cricketers

References

External links
 

1924 births
1992 deaths
New Zealand cricketers
Wellington cricketers
Cricketers from Auckland